"Drown" is a song by British rock band Bring Me the Horizon released on 21 October 2014. Originally released as a stand-alone single, a remixed version features on the band's fifth studio album That's the Spirit and was released as the lead single. The track, musically, marks a shift away from the band's previously established metalcore sound. Rather, it was described by critics as a pop punk-leaning emo and rock song, being the later showcased as arena rock. It is available to play in the music video game Guitar Hero Live, added on 12 January 2016.

It reached No. 17 in the UK, becoming the band's first top-20 single in their home country.

Promotion and release
The song was announced 13 October 2014 on the band's social media accounts. The song leaked on 21 October 2014 on YouTube by accident because of a mistake by Epitaph Records, the band's United States record label. It later premiered officially on BBC Radio 1 that same day. After it aired on BBC Radio 1, Oliver Sykes was interviewed by Zane Lowe. It had been reported that "Drown" would not appear on any studio album from the band. However, the song was later announced to be track 9 on the 2015 album That's the Spirit, albeit as a remixed version.

"Drown" was set to be released on iTunes on 7 December 2014. However, in early October, Oliver Sykes began teasing lyrics in the form of photos on Twitter. He also posted a message stating if "#DROWN" started trending on Twitter, they would release the song sooner. Drown was released on iTunes 3 November 2014. "Drown" was issued as a picture disc in the UK on 7 December. It was nominated for the Kerrang! Award for Best Single.

Later on 8 September 2015, the band performed an acoustic version of "Drown" which was alongside "Happy Song" and "Throne" part of a radio session set at Maida Vale Studios for BBC Radio 1 with Annie Mac. Furthermore, it was accompanied by a small group of violinists. On 25 December 2015, the band released the BBC Radio 1 acoustic performance of "Drown" as a standalone single.

Music video
The music video for the track was released on 21 October 2014 via their Vevo account. It features the band performing the track "rather rigidly", being described as "a far cry from their energetic live shows."

As of November 2022, the music video for "Drown" has over 120 million views on YouTube.

Personnel
Credits adapted from Tidal.

Bring Me the Horizon
 Oliver Sykes – lead vocals, production, composition, programming
 Lee Malia – guitars, composition
 Matt Kean – bass, composition
 Matt Nicholls – drums, composition
 Jordan Fish – keyboards, synthesizers, programming, percussion, backing vocals, production, composition, engineering

Additional personnel
 Al Groves – engineering
 Sam Winfield – engineering
 Nikos Goudinakis – assistant engineering
 Ted Jensen – mastering
 Dan Lancaster – mixing

Charts

Weekly charts

Year-end charts

Certifications

References

2014 singles
Bring Me the Horizon songs
Songs written by Oliver Sykes
2014 songs
Epitaph Records singles
British pop punk songs
British alternative rock songs
Emo songs